Hélio Crescêncio (born 2 January 1933) is a Brazilian boxer. He competed in the men's light middleweight event at the 1960 Summer Olympics.

References

1933 births
Living people
Brazilian male boxers
Olympic boxers of Brazil
Boxers at the 1960 Summer Olympics
Boxers at the 1959 Pan American Games
Pan American Games bronze medalists for Brazil
Pan American Games medalists in boxing
Sportspeople from Rio de Janeiro (city)
Light-middleweight boxers
Medalists at the 1959 Pan American Games
20th-century Brazilian people
21st-century Brazilian people